Emel Sinan Saeed Abdullqader (born  October 22, 1966) is an Iraqi Turkmen actress known for her role of Nadia of the 1988 Iraqi television series Nadia.

Personal life 
Emel Sinan was born in Baku, Azerbaijan to an Iraqi Turkmen father, Sinan Saeed Abdul Qadir (1934 - 06/03/1991), who was writer and broadcaster, and an Azerbaijani mother. She has worked with her father in Baghdad, Turkey, Azerbaijan, and Europe. In the 1980s they settled in Baghdad.

Filmography

Actress

Awards

References

External links 
 https://web.archive.org/web/20120425161058/http://www.mesopot.com/old/adad13/47.htm
 http://www.allafblogspotcom.blogspot.com/2010/06/blog-post_9477.html
 http://annabaa.org/nbanews/2010/08/114.htm
 http://www.mocul.gov.iq/arabic/index.php?name=Pages&op=showcat&cid=85
 http://www.ahewar.org/debat/show.art.asp?aid=236395
 https://www.youtube.com/watch?v=7CgQwOkJZ5U&NR=1
 https://www.youtube.com/watch?v=9DAVNQhqMFg
 http://kalema.a7larab.net/t26808-topic

1966 births
Living people
Actors from Baku
Iraqi Turkmen people
Iraqi television actresses
Iraqi people of Azerbaijani descent
20th-century Iraqi actresses